Calca, also referred to as Villa de Zamora, is a town in southern Peru, capital of Calca Province in Cusco Region. It is at an elevation of around 2926 meters (9600 feet) above sea level.

References

Populated places in the Cusco Region